Peter Pan Playthings Ltd was a British toy company founded in 1963. It bought Salter Science and other assets from the receivers of Thomas Salter Ltd. In 1972 the company reported a £80,000 profit. The following year it was acquired by Berwick Timpo.

The company was sold on to Bluebird Toys in 1987, which continued to use the Peter Pan Playthings brand for several years.

Products

 Anti-Monopoly (under license from Waddingtons)
 Backfire!
 Blow football
 Captain Scarlet and the Mysterons Adventure Game
 Chemistry in Action
 Clash
 Frustration (board game)
 Ginny-O
 Headache
 Master Challenge
 Mr. Potato Head (British version)
 Musical books
 Othello (game)
 Plasticine, following acquisition of Harbutt’s Plasticine Ltd
 Police Patrol
 QED Puzzle Set Squares
 Take the Test
 Thunderbirds To The Rescue Marble Maze
 Thunderbirds International Rescue Game
 Thinkominoes
 Tile Poker
 Tough Luck!
 Triominoes
 Trivia-Challenge

References

External links
 ludorium.at
 Board Game Stock Exchange
 Companies House excerpt
 Boardgamegeek.com
 http://www.patentbuddy.com/Company/Profile/PETER-PAN-PLAYTHINGS-LIMITED/142937
 Planning Application 1972

Toy companies of the United Kingdom
1963 establishments in England
Mattel